Richard Reese Byas, Jr. (October 19, 1950 in Detroit, Michigan) is a former American football defensive back in the National Football League; he was also a 1987 inductee to the Wayne State University Athletic Hall of Fame.

Early years
While at Detroit's Mackenzie High School, Byas led the football team through an undefeated campaign in 1967. That year, Mackenzie's opponents scored only two points during the entire teacher strike-shortened season. Upon graduation in 1969, Byas attended Eastern Michigan University. 

After one year at EMU, Byas transferred to Wayne State; during three seasons with WSU, Byas set or tied eight career, single season and single game football records. In 1973, Byas established WSU single season records for kickoff returns, kickoff return yardage, punt returns, and punt return yardage. Byas was primarily a sprinter and long jumper during his collegiate track and field career; in his senior year, he was captain of both the WSU track and football team. Richard Byas Jr. received his bachelor's degree in education from Wayne State in 1974; the same year he was signed as a free agent by the NFL's Atlanta Falcons.

NFL career
Through seven full seasons with the Falcons, as a defensive back and kickoff return specialist, Byas played in 103 games and produced six career interceptions for 193 yards and one touchdown. Byas also totaled 23 career kickoff returns for 519 yards and a 22.6 yard average, and he forced several blocked punts that resulted in Atlanta touchdowns. 1977 was arguably Byas's best season as a pro; he intercepted three passes for 122 yards, including one interception resulting in the lone touchdown of his career - a 72-yard return of an Archie Manning pass in Atlanta’s 21-20 loss to the New Orleans Saints.

References

1950 births
Living people
American football cornerbacks
American football safeties
American football return specialists
Atlanta Falcons players
Wayne State Warriors football players
Players of American football from Detroit
Eastern Michigan Eagles football players
Mackenzie High School (Michigan) alumni